High Royds, High Royd, Highroyd or Highroyds may refer to several different places.

Two separate areas in Yorkshire, England:
 a part of Menston, West Yorkshire:
 Highroyds Village – a residential development on the site of the former High Royds Hospital, which was also
 the terminus of the High Royds Hospital Railway
 High Royds, South Yorkshire – a mining community near Barnsley,  which was served by
 High Royds railway station.

A historic house the suburb of Annandale, Sydney, Australia:
  Highroyd, Annandale.